In geometry, the small dodecahemicosahedron (or great dodecahemiicosahedron) is a nonconvex uniform polyhedron, indexed as U62. It has 22 faces (12 pentagrams and 10 hexagons), 60 edges, and 30 vertices. Its vertex figure is a crossed quadrilateral.

It is a hemipolyhedron with ten hexagonal faces passing through the model center.

Related polyhedra 

Its convex hull is the icosidodecahedron. It also shares its edge arrangement with the dodecadodecahedron (having the pentagrammic faces in common), and with the great dodecahemicosahedron (having the hexagonal faces in common).

Gallery

See also 
 List of uniform polyhedra

References

External links 
 
 Uniform polyhedra and duals

Uniform polyhedra